Grandhotel   is a Czech comedy film directed by David Ondříček. It was released in 2006.

Plot summary

Cast
 Marek Taclík - Fleischman
 Klára Issová - Ilja
 Jaroslav Plesl - Patka
 Jaromír Dulava - Jégr
 Ladislav Mrkvička - Franz
 Dita Zábranská - Zuzana
 Věra Havelková - Helena Rákosová
 Kryštof Mucha - Milan Lisý
 Kamil Halbich - Doctor
 Tatiana Vilhelmová - Nurse
 Igor Chmela - Bartender
 Jan Španbauer - Inspector
 Ondrej Nerud - Morgue Employee

References

External links
 
 
 

2006 films
2006 comedy films
Czech comedy films
Czech Lion Awards winners (films)
2000s Czech films